Polygnotus was an ancient Greek painter from the middle of the 5th century BC.

Polygnotus may also refer to:

Polygnotos (vase painter), ancient vase painter
Polygnotus (crater), crater on Mercury

Human name disambiguation pages